Kellerberg may refer to:

Hills and high points in Germany
 Kellerberg (Forchheim) (ca. 340 m), hill near Forchheim, county of Forchheim, Upper Franconia, Bavaria
 Kellerberg (Langeln) (187.1 m), hill near Langeln in the northern Harz Foreland, county of Harz, Saxony-Anhalt
 Kellerberg (Meulenwald) (448.7 m), near Dierscheid, highest hill in the Meulenwald (South Eifel), county of Bernkastel-Wittlich, Rhineland-Palatinate
 Kellerberg (Niederdollendorf), spur of the Petersberg in the Siebengebirge near Königswinter, Rhein-Sieg-Kreis, North Rhine-Westphalia
 Kellerberg (Taunus), hill near Bad Homburg vor der Höhe in the Taunus, Hochtaunuskreis, Hesse
 Kellerberg (Waldheim, Saxony), hill in Waldheim, county of Mittelsachsen, Saxony. On it stands St. Nicholas’ Church, Waldheim
 Kellerberg (Bömenzien) (29.3 m), near Bömenzien, municipality of Zehrental, county of Stendal, Saxony-Anhalt

Place
 Kellerberg (Weißenstein), village in the municipality of Weißenstein, district of Villach-Land, Carinthia, Austria

Nature reserve
 Kellerberg (nature reserve), nature reserve in the unparished area of Göhrde, county of Lüchow-Dannenberg, Lower Saxony